Attila Hullám (born 11 February 1987) is a Hungarian footballer who currently plays as a midfielder for Újpest FC.

External links
 HLSZ 
 MLSZ 

Living people
1987 births
Footballers from Budapest
Hungarian footballers
Association football midfielders
Újpest FC players
FC Tatabánya players
FC Sopron players
Szolnoki MÁV FC footballers
Vecsés FC footballers
Szigetszentmiklósi TK footballers
Kecskeméti TE players
Paksi FC players
Nemzeti Bajnokság I players